Ashuganj is an upazila of Brahmanbaria District in the Division of Chittagong, Bangladesh.

The area is home to the Port of Ashuganj.

Demographics
The total population is 180,654, comprising 85,191 males and 89,074 females and 174,265 Muslims, 6,290 Hindus, 69 Buddhists and 117 people following other religions.

Administration
Ashuganj Upazila is divided into eight union parishads: Araishidha, Ashuganj, Char Chartala, Durgapur, Lalpur, Paschim Talshahar, Sarifpur, and Tarua. The union parishads are subdivided into 30 mauzas and 41 villages.

Power plant
Ashuganj Upazila is known for its power plant which generates much of the electricity for the country especially for the capital city. Ashuganj Fertilizer Ltd is on the other side of Ashuganj. It produces chemical fertilizer for the country. It is especially known as commercial area. Almost 2.5% electricity supply from Ashugonj Power Station.

Additional information
In Ashugonj, there are more than 500 rice mills which means above 40% rice supply from Ashugonj. Ashugonj Fertilizer is a biggest chemical fertilizer company. There is a Transit in Ashugonj which communicate with India. Ashugonj City is also known as river port. There is also a gas transmission company.
The area has experienced severe power shortages but a revamped project is being planned and implemented under Japanese Debt Relief Grant Aid.

Notable people
Abdul Quadir, poet, essayist and journalist
Faridul Huda, politician
Mustafa Jabbar, Minister of Post and Telecommunications

See also
Meghna Heli Bridge

References

External links
Country dates with acute power crisis
5th unit of Ashuganj power plant resumes production

Upazilas of Brahmanbaria District